Milen Veltchev (born 24 March 1966) was the finance minister of Bulgaria from 2001 until 2005. He previously worked in finance at Merrill Lynch in London.

He holds MS and BS degrees from the University of National and World Economy in Sofia, Bulgaria; a BA from the University of Rochester and an MBA from the MIT Sloan School of Management.

References

1966 births
Living people
MIT Sloan School of Management alumni
Merrill (company) people
Government ministers of Bulgaria
Finance ministers of Bulgaria
National Movement for Stability and Progress politicians
Fulbright alumni